Mirny is a rural locality (a settlement) in Kirovsky Selsoviet, Loktevsky District, Altai Krai, Russia. The population was 6 as of 2013. There is 1 street.

Geography 
Mirny is located 14 km northeast of Gornyak (the district's administrative centre) by road. Kirovsky is the nearest rural locality.

References 

Rural localities in Loktevsky District